Tuberculariella is a genus of fungi in the family Dermateaceae.

See also
 List of Dermateaceae genera

References

External links

Dermateaceae genera